The American Liberty high relief gold coin is a one-ounce gold bullion coin issued by the United States Mint since 2015.  This coin was the first 100 dollar gold coin to be issued by the US Mint.

Description 
The first American Liberty coin was issued in 2015, and new coins have been released every other year since.  The coins are struck at the West Point Mint on a 1 oz. 24 karat gold planchet.

Design 
Designs for the American Liberty coins are submitted to the US Mint via the Artistic Infusion Program. The United States Commission of Fine Arts reviews the proposed designs and makes recommendations, which the Mint may or may not use.

In addition to the above-listed releases, a one tenth ounce version of the 2017 coin was released in 2018

Silver Medals 
One ounce silver medals were produced in the same design as the gold coins. The medals lack certain inscriptions as well as a denomination, but bear the same motifs of Liberty on the obverse and an eagle on the reverse.

References 

Eagles on coins
Goddess of Liberty on coins
United States gold coins
Bullion coins of the United States
Gold bullion coins